Mount Pleasant High School (MPHS) is a public high school in Mount Pleasant, Michigan, United States. It is part of the Mount Pleasant Public Schools district.

References

External links 
 

Schools in Isabella County, Michigan
Public high schools in Michigan